The Boisé du Tremblay is a wooded area in Longueuil, Quebec, Canada. The wooded area is located partially in the borough of Le Vieux-Longueuil and partially within the city of Boucherville.

The Boisé du Tremblay's biodiversity is considered to be unique within the Montérégie region. It is part of the blue-green infrastructure of Greater Montreal as well as the Mont Saint-Bruno Forest Corridor. It is home to numerous species of flora and fauna, notably the Western chorus frog.

In January 2012, the City of Longueuil requested that the Boisé du Tremblay be recognized as a Wildlife Reserve by the Quebec Ministry of Natural Resources and Wildlife.

See also
Parc Michel-Chartrand

References

Wildlife sanctuaries of Canada
Protected areas of Montérégie
Nature reserves in Quebec
Longueuil
Boucherville